Erlangea calycina is a perennial herb within the Asteraceae family. Its occurs in Tanzania and Kenya.

Description 
The species grows to about 75cm high, with an height range of between 20-75 cm. It has rhizomatous stems covered with silky hairs. Leaves, alternate, are elliptic to obovate in outline, 2.5-12 cm long and 0.5-3 cm wide, pubescent above and beneath, with long white hairs in the case of the latter. Inflorescence is capitulum; the phyllaries' outer surface is foliaceous and it is broadly lanceolate to ovate in outline, the longest is about 14 mm. Corolla is purplish or mauve in color, grows up to 14 mm long, lobes are 3.5-5 mm long, usually with stiff flowers at the apex. Achenes are 3 mm long.

References 

Flora of Kenya
Flora of Tanzania
Flora of East Tropical Africa
Vernonieae